Beware of Dog is the debut studio album by American rapper Lil' Bow Wow. It was released on September 26, 2000 through So So Def Recordings and Columbia Records. Recording sessions took place from 1999 to 2000, with Lil' Bow Wow's mentor Jermaine Dupri primarily producing the album, and Xscape, Jagged Edge, Da Brat and Snoop Dogg, among others, appearing as guests.

Beware of Dog received generally positive reviews from music critics and was also commercially successful, debuting at number eight on the US Billboard 200 chart and selling 101,000 copies in the first week. The Recording Industry Association of America (RIAA) certified it double platinum in March 2001.

Singles 
Four singles were released from the album, all produced by Lil' Bow Wow's mentor and hip hop record producer Jermaine Dupri.  The album's lead single "Bounce with Me", released on August 8, 2000, features guest vocals from American R&B group Xscape, and was also included on the soundtrack for the film Big Momma's House (2000). The album's second single "Bow Wow (That's My Name)", released on October 17, 2000, features a guest verse from fellow rapper Snoop Dogg. The album's third single "Puppy Love", released on January 27, 2001, features guest vocals from fellow R&B group Jagged Edge, and the album's fourth and final single "Ghetto Girls" was released on February 21, 2001.

Critical reception 

Beware of Dog received generally positive reviews from music critics. AllMusic editor Jason Birchmeier praised the tracks for encapsulating the album with endearing charm in its pop-rap material despite doubting Lil Bow Wow's actual writing credits, concluding that "All the same, there's no denying the charm and vocal dexterity of Lil Bow Wow, who proves himself genuinely talented, if not exactly a prodigy." An editor from HipHopDX said that despite Lil Bow Wow's age showing in his lyrics, found potential in his ability to deliver tough lyricism with "Bow Wow (That's My Name)" being a great starting point, concluding that "Beware of Dog is a definite keeper and a trademark to the So So Def dynasty. This album is clear cut winner in my opinion to potentially be rated for best debut album of the year." Robert Christgau graded the album as a "dud", indicating "a bad record whose details rarely merit further thought."

Commercial performance 
Beware of Dog debuted at number eight on the US Billboard 200 chart, selling 101,000 copies in the first week. This became Bow Wow's first US top-ten debut. On March 5, 2001, the album was certified double platinum by the Recording Industry Association of America (RIAA) for shipments of over two million copies. As of December 2006, the album has sold 2.7 million copies in the United States, according to Nielsen Soundscan. In Canada, the album also reached platinum status, selling over 100,000 copies.

Track listing 
 All tracks produced by Jermaine Dupri, except for track 1.

Notes
 The information that were taken from Beware of Dog liner notes:
 "Ghetto Girls" features uncredited vocals by Jagged Edge.

Sample credits
 "Puppy Love" contains a sample of "Kanday" performed by LL Cool J, written by Dwayne Simon, Daryl Pierce, Bobby Erving and James Todd Smith.
 "Bow Wow (That's My Name)" contains a sample of "Atomic Dog" performed by George Clinton, written by George Clinton, Garry Shider and David Spradley.
 "Ghetto Girls" contains a sample of "Covert Action" performed by The Crusaders, written by Wilton Felder.

Personnel 
 Credits taken from Allmusic.

Kwaku Alston – photography
Big Duke – performer
Bow Wow – vocals
Bryan-Michael Cox – performer
Da Brat – performer
Jermaine Dupri – executive producer, mixing, production
Brian Frye – engineering
Erwin Gorostiza – art director
Bernie Grundman – mastering
Bill Hermans – engineering

John Horesco IV – engineering, mixing
Jagged Edge – performer
Carlton Lynn – engineering
William Marshall – grooming
Michael Mauldin – executive producer
Snoop Dogg – performer
Phil Tan – mixing
Xscape – performer
R.O.C. – performer

Charts

Weekly charts

Year-end charts

Decade-end charts

Certifications

References

2000 debut albums
Bow Wow (rapper) albums
So So Def Recordings albums
Albums produced by Jermaine Dupri